Natsuha Matsumoto is a Japanese field hockey player for the Japanese national team.

References

External links
 

1995 births
Living people
Japanese female field hockey players
Female field hockey defenders
Field hockey players at the 2020 Summer Olympics
Olympic field hockey players of Japan
21st-century Japanese women